Exechiini is a tribe of fungus gnats in the family Mycetophilidae. There are about 13 genera and at least 130 described species in Exechiini.

Genera
These 13 genera belong to the tribe Exechiini:

Allodia Winnertz, 1863 i c g b
Allodiopsis Tuomikoski, 1966 i c g
Anatella Winnertz, 1863 i c g
Brachypeza Winnertz, 1863 i c g
Brevicornu Marshall, 1896 i c g b
Cordyla Meigen, 1803 i c g b
Exechia Winnertz, 1863 i c g b
Exechiopsis Tuomikoski, 1966 i c g b
Pseudexechia Tuomikoski, 1966 i c g
Pseudobrachypeza Tuomikoski, 1966 i c g
Rymosia Winnertz, 1863 i c g b
Stigmatomeria Tuomikoski, 1966 i c g
Tarnania Tuomikoski, 1966 i c g

Data sources: i = ITIS, c = Catalogue of Life, g = GBIF, b = Bugguide.net

References

Further reading

External links

Mycetophilidae
Articles created by Qbugbot
Nematocera tribes